Masalani is a settlement in Makueni County, Kenya.

It is part of Twaandu/Kiboko ward of Kibwezi Constituency and Makueni County Council.

References 

Makueni County
Populated places in Eastern Province (Kenya)